Ji-hun, also spelled Ji-hoon, is a Korean masculine given name. The meaning differs based on the hanja used to write each syllable of the name. There are 46 hanja with the reading "ji" and 12 hanja with the reading "hun" on the South Korean government's official list of hanja which may be used in given names. Ji-hun has been a popular name for South Korean baby boys for several decades, coming in fourth place in 1970, first place in 1980, and first place again in 1990. In 2008 it was the second-most popular name for baby boys, with 2,158 given the name.

People with this name include:

Entertainers
Kim Ji-hoon (singer) (1973–2013), South Korean singer
Lee Ji-hoon (entertainer) (born 1979), South Korean singer and actor
Kim Ji-hoon (actor, born 1981), South Korean actor
Ju Ji-hoon (born 1982), South Korean actor
Rain (entertainer) (born Jung Ji-hoon, 1982), South Korean singer and actor
Lee Ji-hoon (actor, born 1988), South Korean actor
Roh Ji-hoon (born 1990), South Korean singer
P.O (born Pyo Ji-hoon, 1993), South Korean singer and actor, member of boy group Block B
Woozi (born Lee Ji-hoon, 1996), South Korean singer, member of boy group Seventeen
Seo Ji-hoon (actor) (born 1997), South Korean actor 
Shin Ji-hoon (born 1998), South Korean female singer and figure skater
Park Ji-hoon (born 1999), South Korean singer and actor, member of boy group Wanna One
Kim Ji-hoon (actor, born 2000), South Korean actor and singer, member of boy group TRCNG

Sportspeople
Chae Ji-hoon (born 1974), South Korean short track speed skater
Kim Ji-hoon (gymnast) (born 1984), South Korean gymnast
Baek Ji-hoon (born 1985), South Korean football midfielder
Kim Ji-hoon (sailor) (born 1985), South Korean sailor
Kim Ji-hoon (boxer) (born 1987), South Korean boxer
Hong Ji-hoon (born 1988), South Korean badminton player
Yoo Ji-hoon (born 1988), South Korean football midfielder
Lee Ji-hoon (sledge hockey) (born 1989), South Korean ice sledge hockey player
Cho Ji-hun (born 1990), South Korean football midfielder
Kim Ji-hun (wrestler) (born 1992), South Korean Greco-Roman wrestler
Kang Ji-hoon (born 1997), South Korean football midfielder
To Ji-hun (born 2003), South Korean female figure skater

Other
Cho Chi-hun (1920–1968), Korean poet
Kim Ji-hoon (director) (born 1971), South Korean director
Rim Ji-hoon (born 1980), South Korean businessman, CEO of Kakao
Seo Ji-hun (video game player) (born 1985), South Korean professional StarCraft player

See also
List of Korean given names

References

Korean masculine given names